Christos Rovas (born 2 September 1994) is a Greek professional footballer who plays as a forward for Super League 2 club Kalamata.

References

1994 births
Living people
Greek footballers
Greek expatriate footballers
Gamma Ethniki players
Football League (Greece) players
Super League Greece 2 players
Slovenian PrvaLiga players
Ethnikos Sidirokastro F.C. players
Ionikos F.C. players
Apollon Pontou FC players
Iraklis Thessaloniki F.C. players
Doxa Drama F.C. players
Almopos Aridea F.C. players
Kalamata F.C. players
Expatriate footballers in Slovenia
Association football forwards
Sportspeople from Chios